The Estevan Bruins are a junior ice hockey team playing in the Junior "A" Saskatchewan Junior Hockey League (SJHL). The team is based in Estevan, Saskatchewan, Canada, and plays at Affinity Place. They were founded in 1971, when a previous franchise called the Estevan Bruins, which played in the Saskatchewan Junior Hockey League from 1957 to 1966 and then the Major Junior Western Hockey League (WHL) from 1966 to 1971, relocated to New Westminster, British Columbia.

The original Estevan Bruins (1957–1971)
In 1956, Scotty Munro made a presentation to the leaders of the booming oil town of Estevan. His plan was to move his Humboldt/Melfort Indians (playing in Humboldt and Melfort, Saskatchewan), which was a franchise in the original version of the Saskatchewan Junior Hockey League (1948–1966), to Estevan. The concept of Major Junior hockey had not yet been created, so this original SJHL was playing at the top level of junior hockey in Saskatchewan; should the citizens of Estevan finance the building of a new arena, Munro would bring top-notch hockey entertainment and much-needed help for minor hockey in the town.

His pitch was successful and one year later his newly renamed "Bruins" arrived in Estevan to begin the 1957–58 season in the newly built Agricultural Auditorium. At the time, the Saskatchewan Junior Hockey League had six teams. The league had grown to eight teams by its final season, 1965–66, then disbanded when five of its eight teamsincluding the Estevan Bruinsjoined the newly formed Canadian Major Junior Hockey League (along with two Alberta-based teams) for the inaugural 1966–67 CMJHL season.

The CMJHL was renamed the Western Canada Junior Hockey League, expanding into Manitoba, for the 1967–68 WCHL season. The Bruins scored their greatest success in that 1967–68 season, finishing second in the regular season before winning the President's Cup as WCHL playoff champions. They advanced to face British Columbia's Mowat Cup champion, the Penticton Broncos, whom they defeated to take the Abbott Cup as champion of Western Canada. The Bruins then faced Ontario's Niagara Falls Flyers, winner of Eastern Canada's George Richardson Memorial Trophy (having defeated Quebec's Verdun Maple Leafs), in a best-of-7 series for the 1968 Memorial Cup national championship. The Bruins were defeated, in five games, as the Flyers won their second Memorial Cup.

The Bruins played in Estevan through to the completion of the 1970-71 WCHL season, then relocated to New Westminster, British Columbia, where they became the New Westminster Bruins.

Season-by-season results
Note: GP = Games played, W = Wins, L = Losses, T = Ties, OTL = Overtime Losses, Pts = Points, GF = Goals for, GA = Goals against

The modern Estevan Bruins
With the departure of the major junior Bruins, a new Bruins team was founded in Estevan that same year, which has played in the SJHL ever since. The Estevan Bruins won the SJHL championship in 1985 and 1999.

Radio station CKSE-FM (Rock 106) broadcasts Bruins games. DiscoverEstevan.com covers the team on a daily basis. The team is also covered in print on a weekly basis by the Estevan Mercury and Estevan Lifestyles.

Season-by-season results
Note: GP = Games played, W = Wins, L = Losses, T = Ties, OTL = Overtime Losses, Pts = Points, GF = Goals for, GA = Goals against

Playoffs

1972 Lost Quarter-final
Humboldt Broncos defeated Estevan Bruins 4 games to none
1973 Lost Final
Estevan Bruins defeated Regina Blues 4 games to 2
Estevan Bruins defeated Weyburn Red Wings 4 games to 1
Humboldt Broncos defeated Estevan Bruins 4 games to 2
1974 Lost Final
Estevan Bruins defeated Moose Jaw Canucks 4 games to none
Estevan Bruins defeated Weyburn Red Wings 4 games to 1
Prince Albert Raiders defeated Estevan Bruins 4 games to 1
1975 Lost Quarter-final
Weyburn Red Wings defeated Estevan Bruins 4 games to 3
1976 Lost Quarter-final
Melville Millionaires defeated Estevan Bruins 4 games to 3
1977 DNQ
1978 Lost Quarter-final
Regina Blues defeated Estevan Bruins 4 games to 1
1979 DNQ
1980 Lost Semi-final
Estevan Bruins defeated Regina Blues 4 games to none
Moose Jaw Canucks defeated Estevan Bruins 4 games to 2
1981 Lost Semi-final
Estevan Bruins defeated Yorkton Terriers 4 games to 3
Moose Jaw Canucks defeated Estevan Bruins 4 games to none
1982 DNQ
1983 Lost Quarter-final
Yorkton Terriers defeated Estevan Bruins 4 games to none
1984 Lost Quarter-final
Melville Millionaires defeated Estevan Bruins 4 games to 1
1985 Won League, Won Anavet Cup, Lost Abbott Cup
Estevan Bruins defeated Lloydminster Lancers 4 games to none
Estevan Bruins defeated Battlefords North Stars 4 games to 1
Estevan Bruins defeated Weyburn Red Wings 4 games to 3 SAJHL CHAMPIONS
Estevan Bruins defeated Selkirk Steelers (MJHL) 4 games to 1 ANAVET CUP CHAMPIONS
Penticton Knights (BCJHL) defeated Estevan Bruins 4 games to none
1986 Lost Final
Estevan Bruins defeated Melville Millionaires 4 games to none
Estevan Bruins defeated Weyburn Red Wings 4 games to none
Humboldt Broncos defeated Estevan Bruins 4 games to 3
1987 Lost Quarter-final
Lloydminster Lancers defeated Estevan Bruins 4 games to 1
1988 Lost Quarter-final
Humboldt Broncos defeated Estevan Bruins 4 games to 1 
1989 Lost Quarter-final
Humboldt Broncos defeated Estevan Bruins 4 games to none
1990 Lost Quarter-final
Weyburn Red Wings defeated Estevan Bruins 4 games to 2
1991 DNQ
1992 Lost Final
Estevan Bruins defeated Yorkton Terriers 4 games to none
Estevan Bruins defeated Melville Millionaires 4 games to 1
Melfort Mustangs defeated Estevan Bruins 4 games to 1
1993 Lost Semi-final
Estevan Bruins defeated Yorkton Terriers 4 games to 2
Melville Millionaires defeated Estevan Bruins 4 games to 1
1994 Lost Preliminary
Notre Dame Hounds defeated Estevan Bruins 3 games to 1
1995 Lost Quarter-final
Estevan Bruins defeated Melville Millionaires 2 games to none
Lebret Eagles defeated Estevan Bruins 4 games to 1
1996 Lost Semi-final
Estevan Bruins defeated Lebret Eagles 4 games to 2
Yorkton Terriers defeated Estevan Bruins 4 games to 3
1997 Lost Quarter-final
Estevan Bruins defeated Minot Top Guns 2 games to none
Weyburn Red Wings defeated Estevan Bruins 4 games to none
1998 Lost Quarter-final
Weyburn Red Wings defeated Estevan Bruins 4 games to 1
1999 Won League, Won Anavet Cup, Eliminated from 1999 Royal Bank Cup round robin
Estevan Bruins defeated Melville Millionaires 4 games to none 
Estevan Bruins defeated Notre Dame Hounds 4 games to 1 
Estevan Bruins defeated Humboldt Broncos 4 games to none SJHL CHAMPIONS
Estevan Bruins defeated OCN Blizzard (MJHL) 4 games to 2 ANAVET CUP CHAMPIONS
Fifth in 1999 Royal Bank Cup round robin (1-3)
2000 Lost Quarter-final
First in round robin (2-2) vs. Weyburn Red Wings and Yorkton Terriers
Melville Millionaires defeated Estevan Bruins 4 games to 1
2001 DNQ
2002 Lost Quarter-final
Humboldt Broncos defeated Estevan Bruins 4 games to 1
2003 DNQ
2004 DNQ
2005 Lost Semi-final
Third in round robin (1-3) vs. Yorkton Terriers and Notre Dame Hounds
Estevan Bruins defeated Humboldt Broncos 4 games to none
Yorkton Terriers defeated Estevan Bruins 4 games to 3
2006 DNQ
2007 Lost Quarter-final
Second in round robin (1-2-1) vs. Melville Millionaires and Yorkton Terriers
Yorkton Terriers defeated Estevan Bruins 4 games to 2
2008 Lost Preliminary
Yorkton Terriers defeated Estevan Bruins 4 games to 2
2009 Lost Preliminary
Kindersley Klippers defeated Estevan Bruins 3 games to 2
2010 DNQ
2011 Lost Quarter-final
Estevan Bruins defeated Melville Millionaires 3 games to 2
Yorkton Terriers defeated Estevan Bruins 4 games to none
2012 
Qualifying Round Estevan Bruins defeated Notre Dame Hounds 3 games to 0
Quarter-Final Weyburn Red Wings defeated Estevan Bruins 4 games to none
2013 
Qualifying Round Estevan Bruins defeated Kindersley Klippers 3 games to 1
Quarter-Final Yorkton Terriers defeated Estevan Bruins 4 games to 1
2014
Qualifying Round Estevan Bruins defeated Flin Flon Bombers 3 games to 2
Quarter-Final Battlefords North Stars defeated Estevan Bruins 4 games to 1
2015
Survivor Series Battlefords North Stars defeated Estevan Bruins 3 games to 2
2016
Quarter-Final Nipawin Hawks defeated Estevan Bruins 4 games to 2
2017
Semi-Final Estevan Bruins defeated Yorkton Terriers 4 games to 1
Quarter-Final Battlefords North Stars defeated Estevan Bruins 4 games to 0
2018
Quarter-Final Estevan Bruins defeated Kindersley Klippers 4 games to 0
Semi-Final Estevan Bruins defeated Kindersley Klippers 4 games to 0
Final Nipawin Hawks defeated Estevan Bruins 4 games to 3
2019
Quarter-Final Estevan Bruins defeated Humboldt Broncos 4 games to 3
Quarter-Final Melfort Mustangs defeated Estevan Bruins 4 games to 2
2020
Quarter-Final Melfort Mustangs leading Estevan Bruins 3 games to 1
 Playoffs cancelled due to COVID-19 pandemic
2021 Season cancelled due to COVID-19 pandemic
2022
Quarter-Final Estevan Bruins defeated Notre Dame Hounds 4 games to 1
Semi-Final Estevan Bruins defeated Yorkton Terriers 4 games to 0
Final Estevan Bruins defeated Flin Flon Bombers 4 games to 3 SJHL CHAMPIONS

Western Canada Cup
Western Canada Championships ** BCHL — AJHL — SJHL — MJHL — Host  **
Round-robin play with 1st vs 2nd – winner advance to National Championship and loser to runner-up game3rd vs 4th in a second semifinal with winner to runner-up game. Runner-up game determines second representative to National Championship.Competition began 2013 season.

See also
 List of ice hockey teams in Saskatchewan

References

External links
 Estevan Bruins official website

1957 establishments in Saskatchewan
Defunct Western Hockey League teams
Saskatchewan Junior Hockey League teams
Sport in Estevan
Ice hockey clubs established in 1957
Boston Bruins minor league affiliates